The spleen is an organ in the human body.

Spleen may also refer to:
Spleen, poem by Baudelaire
 Spleen (Chinese medicine), an element of body function
 A French rapper/musician who sometimes performs with CocoRosie
 A character in Mystery Men
 "Spleen", a song by Staind from Dysfunction

See also 
 Splean